Ericka Hart is an American sex educator, model, and professor.

Background 
After being diagnosed with bilateral breast cancer in May 2014 at the age of 28, Hart went viral for attending Afropunk topless, showing scars from her double mastectomy. "We don’t go to the doctor because of historical trauma, institutionalized racism, so on and so forth. And we die faster because if you find cancer later on, your rates of survival are less." Hart explained, "I wore my chest out because I wanted to raise awareness, but I also...still feel really sexy with my body this way, and I want to be received as sexy, not just as a survivor." Since then, Hart has posted topless for Paper magazine, Out magazine, and on the runway of Chromat's Fall 2018 show at New York Fashion Week. "Being a part of the QTPOC community, and seeing how little information is geared towards us [in the media], breast cancer is literally killing us and my hope is to inspire many people across a spectrum of gender identities," she told Vogue. "The societal assumption is that having a double mastectomy would somehow make my body abnormal, or that not having nipples must signal a descent into shame or discomfort around my body image, but my relationship with my body hasn't changed."

Hart graduated from the University of Miami Coral Gables in 2008 with a degree in theater and psychology. Hart has a Master’s of Education in Human Sexuality from Widener University. From 2008-2010, Hart served as a HIV/AIDS volunteer in the Peace Corps in Ethiopia.

Career 
A former adjunct professor at the Columbia School of Social Work, Hart taught human sexuality. She has taught sexuality education to audiences ranging from elementary-aged youth to adults. A difficult experience trying to learn about sex as a child inspired her to become an educator. She told Forbes, “I didn’t understand how I could ask questions about anything else, but when it came to sex it was just quiet, and people skated around the issue…I started to get that this has a lot to do with people’s discomfort and I just wanted to make people feel comfortable with asking about this topic.” Hart was recognized on the Root100 in 2018 for her work as an "advocate for post-cancer body positivity".

Hart told Forbes she was pushed out of her teaching job at Columbia because she expressed concern about a student who made rape jokes in class and was transphobic and racist towards Hart. When Hart brought her concerns to Dean Melissa Begg and Associate Dean Julian Teitler during the spring 2020 semester, she was told her contract as an adjunct professor for the fall would not be renewed. Over 1,300 people signed a petition circulated by a student group calling for the resignation of three deans involved in the case. Hart spoke out against Columbia’s lack of support for adjunct professors —  a larger percentage of whom are Black or Latino than full-time faculty. Hart demanded the school release the demographic information for adjunct and full-time faculty. In response, Begg posted stats to the school’s website showing 18 percent of full-time staffers are Black or Latino, while 36 percent of adjunct faculty are Black or Latino.

Hart co-hosts the podcast, Hoodrat to Headwrap: A Decolonized Podcast. Women's Health wrote, "Hosts Ericka Hart and Ebony Donnley allow their listeners to take part in an intimate conversation, sprinkled with comedic relief, glowing personalities, and radical seeds of self love."

In December 2022, Hinge hired Hart to offer advice on non-sexual forms of intimacy for asexual people.

Personal life 
Hart's mother died of breast cancer when Hart was 13, prompting her family to move from Maryland to Puerto Rico.

Hart identifies as queer and "nonbinary femme." She uses she/her and they/them pronouns. Hart is polyamorous.

In May 2014, at age 28, Hart received their breast cancer diagnosis. Hart did not have access to health insurance at the time and worked for a year and a half while doing chemotherapy. Hart had their double mastectomy in June 2014 and went back to work two weeks later.

At age 29, Hart married Emily Humphrey, a 30-year-old health coach she first met while they were both serving in the Peace Corps in Ethiopia. Hart and Humphrey divorced a year and a half later.

Hart currently lives with her partner, Ebony Donnley, and their dog, Baguette X, in Brooklyn, NY. Hart and Donnley met on Tinder. Donnley is a writer, audio engineer, and Hart's manager.

On February 14, 2023, Hart gave birth to their first child, East Francis Coltrane Hart-Donnley. East was born six weeks before the date Hart was expected to give birth.

Notes

References 

Non-binary models
Non-binary artists
Living people
American models
American LGBT writers
Sex education advocates
Year of birth missing (living people)